Ricardo Bauleo (30 August 1940 – 24 April 2014) was an Argentine actor. He worked most on movies and television shows. His best known roles were in Blood of the Virgins (1967), The Curious Dr. Humpp (1969) and Los superagentes no se rompen (1979). He was born in Buenos Aires.

Bauleo married Thelma Stefani in 1976 but they later divorced. He then married Gilda Lousek with whom he had two daughters.  Bauleo died from heart failure after a long illness on 24 April 2014 in Buenos Aires. He was 73.

References

External links
 

1940 births
2014 deaths
Argentine male film actors
Male actors from Buenos Aires
Argentine male television actors
Argentine male stage actors
20th-century Argentine male actors
21st-century Argentine male actors
Burials at La Chacarita Cemetery